John Weaver may refer to:

John Weaver (artist) (1920–2012), American sculptor and curator
John Weaver (Bridgnorth MP) (1675–1747), British lawyer and politician
John Weaver (dancer) (1673–1760), English dancer and choreographer
J. R. H. Weaver (1882–1965), historian, President of Trinity College, Oxford
John Weaver (mayor) (1861–1928), mayor of Philadelphia
John Weaver (political consultant) (born 1959), American political consultant
John Weaver (Stamford MP) (died 1685), English politician
John B. Weaver (born 1974), Dean of Library, Abilene Christian University
John C. Weaver (historian), Canadian historian
John Carrier Weaver (1915–1995), American professor and administrator
John Ernst Weaver (1884–1966), American botanist
John Van Alstyne Weaver (1893–1938), American poet, novelist and screenwriter
Johnny Weaver (1935–2008), professional wrestler and wrestling commentator

See also
John Weever (1567–1632), English antiquary and poet
Jonathan Weaver (disambiguation)